'The Douglas Mine' also known as the 'Douglas and Echo Mine' is a mineral sands mine near the small Western-Victorian town of Balmoral. It was established in 2006 to mine rutile and zircon, and then closed in 2012. Watpac, the construction company responsible for mine operations, estimated that it extracted 7.5 million tonnes of mineral sands from the mine.

Current Status

Iluka Resources stated that it is committed to rehabilitating the site. However The Age Newspaper reported that Iluka Resources "is seeking approval to continue to operate the Douglas mine site as a dumping ground for up to 20 years because laws require mining companies to be operating a mine in the state to be able to process and store byproduct." The ABC reported that radioactive gas, a byproduct of the mineral sand mining, had been reported at levels that exceeded the "maximum for public exposure". After the mine closed, The Wimmera Mail-Times reported that local landowners were concerned that the levels of air and water contamination were not being independently monitored.  However, the Victorian Environment Protection Authority declared that "it has found that neither pollution or environmental hazard has occurred nor is likely to occur in the future as a result of current and proposed Pit 23 disposal activities."

References

External links
Watpac, mine construction company
Iluka, mine owners

Mines in Victoria (Australia)
Zirconium mines in Australia